This list of birds of Jinja details the avifauna of the Jinja District of Uganda.

The Jinja District is in the Eastern Region of Uganda and has the second largest economy in the country. The city of Jinja is on the shore of Lake Victoria, which leads into the Nile river.

There are 583 different species of birds in Jinja as of October 2019 according to Bird Checklists of the World. Of these, 13 species are globally threatened and two are introduced species.

The common and scientic names of species and their sequence are those of the Howard and Moore taxonomy, 4th edition.

Anseriformes: Anatidae 
White-faced whistling duck, Dendrocygna viduata
Fulvous whistling duck, Dendrocygna bicolor
Egyptian goose, Alopochen aegyptiaca
Southern pochard, Netta erythrophthalma
Garganey, Spatula querquedula
Blue-billed teal, Spatula hottentota
Eurasian wigeon, Mareca penelope
African black duck, Anas sparsa
Yellow-billed duck, Anas undulata
Red-billed teal, Anas erythrorhyncha
Northern pintail, Anas acuta
Common teal, Anas crecca
White-backed duck, Thalassornis leuconotus
Spur-winged goose, Plectropterus gambensis
Comb duck, Sarkidiornis melanotos
African pygmy goose, Nettapus auritus

Galliformes: Numididae 

Helmeted guineafowl, Numida meleagris
Crested guineafowl, Guttera pucherani

Galliformes: Phasianidae 

Common quail, Coturnix coturnix
Harlequin quail, Coturnix delegorguei
Blue quail, Synoicus adansonii
Scaly francolin, Pternistis squamatus
Crested francolin, Dendroperdix sephaena
Forest francolin, Peliperdix lathami

Phoenicopteriformes: Podicipedidae 
Little grebe, Tachybaptus ruficollis

Columbiformes: Columbidae 
Speckled pigeon, Columba guinea
Afep pigeon, Columba unicincta
Lemon dove, Aplopelia larvata
Mourning collared dove, Streptopelia decipiens
Red-eyed dove, Streptopelia semitorquata
Ring-necked dove, Streptopelia capicola
Vinaceous dove, Streptopelia vinacea
Laughing dove, Streptopelia senegalensis
Bruce's green pigeon, Treron waalia
African green pigeon, Treron calvus
Blue-spotted wood dove, Turtur afer
Tambourine dove, Turtur tympanistria
Namaqua dove, Oena capensis

Caprimulgiformes: Caprimulgidae 
European nightjar, Caprimulgus europaeus
Fiery-necked nightjar, Caprimulgus pectoralis
Swamp nightjar, Caprimulgus natalensis
Plain nightjar, Caprimulgus inornatus
Freckled nightjar, Caprimulgus tristigma
Long-tailed nightjar, Caprimulgus climacurus
Slender-tailed nightjar, Caprimulgus clarus
Standard-winged nightjar, Caprimulgus longipennis
Pennant-winged nightjar, Caprimulgus vexillarius

Caprimulgiformes: Apodidae 
Mottled spinetailed swift, Telacanthura ussheri
Sabine's spinetailed swift, Rhaphidura sabini
Cassin's spinetailed swift, Neafrapus cassini
Scarce swift, Schoutedenapus myoptilus
African palm swift, Cypsiurus parvus
Alpine swift, Tachymarptis melba
White-rumped swift, Apus caffer
Little swift, Apus affinis
African swift, Apus barbatus
Common swift, Apus apus

Cuculiformes: Cuculidae 
Senegal coucal, Centropus senegalensis
Blue-headed coucal, Centropus monachus
White-browed coucal, Centropus superciliosus
African black coucal, Centropus grillii
Yellowbill, Ceuthmochares aereus
Jacobin cuckoo, Clamator jacobinus
Levaillant's cuckoo, Clamator levaillantii
Great spotted cuckoo, Clamator glandarius
Klaas's cuckoo, Chrysococcyx klaas
African emerald cuckoo, Chrysococcyx cupreus
Diederick cuckoo, Chrysococcyx caprius
Dusky long-tailed cuckoo, Cercococcyx mechowi
Red-chested cuckoo, Cuculus solitarius
Black cuckoo, Cuculus clamosus
Common cuckoo, Cuculus canorus
African cuckoo, Cuculus gularis
Madagascar cuckoo, Cuculus rochii

Gruiformes: Rallidae 
African rail, Rallus caerulescens
African crake, Crex egregia
Corncrake, Crex crex
Spotted crake, Porzana porzana
Black crake, Zapornia flavirostra
Baillon's crake, Zapornia pusilla
Striped crake, Amaurornis marginalis
Purple swamphen, Porphyrio porphyrio
Allen's gallinule, Porphyrio alleni
Common moorhen, Gallinula chloropus
Lesser moorhen, Gallinula angulata
Red-knobbed coot, Fulica cristata

Gruiformes: Sarothruridae 
White-spotted flufftail, Sarothrura pulchra
Buff-spotted flufftail, Sarothrura elegans
Red-chested flufftail, Sarothrura rufa

Gruiformes: Heliornithidae 
African finfoot, Podica senegalensis

Gruiformes: Gruidae 
Grey crowned crane, Balearica regulorum

Otidiformes: Otididae 
Black-bellied bustard, Lissotis melanogaster

Musophagiformes: Musophagidae 
Great blue turaco, Corythaeola cristata
Eastern grey plantain-eater, Crinifer zonurus
Black-billed turaco, Tauraco schuettii
White-crested turaco, Tauraco leucolophus
Ross's turaco, Tauraco rossae

Pelecaniformes: Ciconiidae 
Marabou, Leptoptilos crumenifer
Yellow-billed stork, Mycteria ibis
African openbill, Anastomus lamelligerus
Black stork, Ciconia nigra
Abdim's stork, Ciconia abdimii
Woolly-necked stork, Ciconia episcopus
European white stork, Ciconia ciconia
Saddle-bill stork, Ephippiorhynchus senegalensis

Pelecaniformes: Pelecanidae 
Great white pelican, Pelecanus onocrotalus
Pink-backed pelican, Pelecanus rufescens

Pelecaniformes: Scopidae 
Hamerkop, Scopus umbretta

Pelecaniformes: Balaenicipitidae 
Shoebill, Balaeniceps rex

Pelecaniformes: Ardeidae 
Little bittern, Ixobrychus minutus
Dwarf bittern, Ixobrychus sturmii
Black-crowned night heron, Nycticorax nycticorax
Striated heron, Butorides striata
Squacco heron, Ardeola ralloides
Madagascar pond heron, Ardeola idae
Rufous-bellied heron, Ardeola rufiventris
Cattle egret, Bubulcus ibis
Grey heron, Ardea cinerea
Black-headed heron, Ardea melanocephala
Goliath heron, Ardea goliath
Purple heron, Ardea purpurea
Great egret, Ardea alba
Intermediate egret, Ardea intermedia
Black heron, Egretta ardesiaca
Little egret, Egretta garzetta

Pelecaniformes: Threskiornithidae 
African sacred ibis, Threskiornis aethiopicus
African spoonbill, Platalea alba
Hadada ibis, Bostrychia hagedash
Glossy ibis, Plegadis falcinellus

Pelecaniformes: Phalacrocoracidae 
Long-tailed cormorant, Microcarbo africanus
Great cormorant, Phalacrocorax carbo

Pelecaniformes: Anhingidae 
African darter, Anhinga rufa

Charadriiformes: Burhinidae 
Water thick-knee, Burhinus vermiculatus

Charadriiformes: Recurvirostridae 
Pied avocet, Recurvirostra avosetta
Black-winged stilt, Himantopus himantopus

Charadriiformes: Charadriidae 
Common ringed plover, Charadrius hiaticula
Little ringed plover, Charadrius dubius
Kittlitz's plover, Charadrius pecuarius
Three-banded plover, Charadrius tricollaris
Caspian plover, Charadrius asiaticus
Long-toed lapwing, Vanellus crassirostris
Spur-winged lapwing, Vanellus spinosus
Senegal lapwing, Vanellus lugubris
African wattled lapwing, Vanellus senegallus
Brown-chested lapwing, Vanellus superciliosus

Charadriiformes: Rostratulidae 
Greater painted-snipe, Rostratula benghalensis

Charadriiformes: Jacanidae 
African jacana, Actophilornis africanus
Lesser jacana, Microparra capensis

Charadriiformes: Scolopacidae 
Whimbrel, Numenius phaeopus
Eurasian curlew, Numenius arquata
Black-tailed godwit, Limosa limosa
Ruff, Calidris pugnax
Curlew sandpiper, Calidris ferruginea
Temminck's stint, Calidris temminckii
Little stint, Calidris minuta
Great snipe, Gallinago media
Common snipe, Gallinago gallinago
Jack snipe, Lymnocryptes minimus
Common sandpiper, Actitis hypoleucos
Green sandpiper, Tringa ochropus
Spotted redshank, Tringa erythropus
Common greenshank, Tringa nebularia
Common redshank, Tringa totanus
Wood sandpiper, Tringa glareola
Marsh sandpiper, Tringa stagnatilis

Charadriiformes: Turnicidae 
Common buttonquail, Turnix sylvaticus

Charadriiformes: Glareolidae 
Bronze-winged courser, Rhinoptilus chalcopterus
Temminck's courser, Cursorius temminckii
Collared pratincole, Glareola pratincola
Rock pratincole, Glareola nuchalis

Charadriiformes: Laridae 
African skimmer, Rynchops flavirostris
Black-headed gull, Chroicocephalus ridibundus
Gray-hooded gull, Chroicocephalus cirrocephalus
Lesser black-backed gull, Larus fuscus
Gull-billed tern, Gelochelidon nilotica
Caspian tern, Hydroprogne caspia
Whiskered tern, Chlidonias hybrida
White-winged tern, Chlidonias leucopterus
Black tern, Chlidonias niger

Accipitriformes: Sagittariidae 
Secretary-bird, Sagittarius serpentarius

Accipitriformes: Pandionidae 
Osprey, Pandion haliaetus

Accipitriformes: Accipitridae 
Black-winged kite, Elanus caeruleus
Scissor-tailed kite, Chelictinia riocourii
European honey buzzard, Pernis apivorus
African cuckoo hawk, Aviceda cuculoides
African harrier hawk, Polyboroides typus
Palm-nut vulture, Gypohierax angolensis
Bateleur, Terathopius ecaudatus
Black-chested snake eagle, Circaetus pectoralis
Brown snake eagle, Circaetus cinereus
Western banded snake eagle, Circaetus cinerascens
White-headed vulture, Trigonoceps occipitalis
Hooded vulture, Necrosyrtes monachus
White-backed vulture, Gyps africanus
Rüppell's vulture, Gyps rueppelli
Bat hawk, Macheiramphus alcinus
Martial eagle, Polemaetus bellicosus
Long-crested eagle, Lophaetus occipitalis
Tawny eagle, Aquila rapax
Steppe eagle, Aquila nipalensis
African hawk eagle, Aquila spilogaster
Cassin's hawk eagle, Aquila africana
Wahlberg's eagle, Hieraaetus wahlbergi
Ayres's eagle, Hieraaetus ayresii
Lizard buzzard, Kaupifalco monogrammicus
Dark chanting goshawk, Melierax metabates
Gabar goshawk, Micronisus gabar
Western marsh harrier, Circus aeruginosus
African marsh harrier, Circus ranivorus
Pallid harrier, Circus macrourus
Montagu's harrier, Circus pygargus
African goshawk, Accipiter tachiro
Shikra, Accipiter badius
Little sparrowhawk, Accipiter minullus
Ovambo sparrowhawk, Accipiter ovampensis
Black sparrowhawk, Accipiter melanoleucus
African fish eagle, Haliaeetus vocifer
Black kite, Milvus migrans
Augur buzzard, Buteo augur
Eurasian buzzard, Buteo buteo
Long-legged buzzard, Buteo rufinus

Strigiformes: Tytonidae 
Common barn owl, Tyto alba

Strigiformes: Strigidae 
Pearl-spotted owlet, Glaucidium perlatum
African scops owl, Otus senegalensis
Southern white-faced owl, Ptilopsis granti
Marsh owl, Asio capensis
African wood owl, Strix woodfordii
Spotted eagle owl, Bubo africanus
Verreaux's eagle owl, Bubo lacteus

Coliiformes: Coliidae 
Speckled mousebird, Colius striatus
Blue-naped mousebird, Urocolius macrourus

Trogoniformes: Trogonidae 
Narina's trogon, Apaloderma narina

Bucerotiformes: Bucerotidae 
Northern ground hornbill, Bucorvus abyssinicus
Crowned hornbill, Tockus alboterminatus
African pied hornbill, Tockus fasciatus
African grey hornbill, Tockus nasutus
White-thighed hornbill, Bycanistes albotibialis
Grey-cheeked hornbill, Bycanistes subcylindricus

Bucerotiformes: Upupidae 
Common hoopoe, Upupa epops

Bucerotiformes: Phoeniculidae 
Green wood-hoopoe, Phoeniculus purpureus
White-headed wood-hoopoe, Phoeniculus bollei
Forest wood-hoopoe, Phoeniculus castaneiceps
Common scimitarbill, Rhinopomastus cyanomelas

Piciformes: Indicatoridae 
Cassin's honeybird, Prodotiscus insignis
Least honeyguide, Indicator exilis
Lesser honeyguide, Indicator minor
Scaly-throated honeyguide, Indicator variegatus
Greater honeyguide, Indicator indicator

Piciformes: Picidae 
Northern wryneck, Jynx torquilla
Nubian woodpecker, Campethera nubica
Green-backed woodpecker, Campethera cailliautii
Buff-spotted woodpecker, Campethera nivosa
Brown-eared woodpecker, Campethera caroli
Speckle-breasted woodpecker, Dendropicos poecilolaemus
Cardinal woodpecker, Dendropicos fuscescens
Bearded woodpecker, Chloropicus namaquus
Yellow-crested woodpecker, Chloropicus xantholophus
Grey woodpecker, Mesopicos goertae

Piciformes: Ramphastidae 
Yellow-spotted barbet, Buccanodon duchaillui
Grey-throated barbet, Gymnobucco bonapartei
Speckled tinkerbird, Pogoniulus scolopaceus
Yellow-throated tinkerbird, Pogoniulus subsulphureus
Yellow-rumped tinkerbird, Pogoniulus bilineatus
Yellow-fronted tinkerbird, Pogoniulus chrysoconus
Hairy-breasted barbet, Tricholaema hirsuta
Spot-flanked barbet, Tricholaema lacrymosa
White-headed barbet, Lybius leucocephalus
Black-billed barbet, Lybius guifsobalito
Double-toothed barbet, Pogonornis bidentatus
Yellow-billed barbet, Trachylaemus purpuratus

Coraciiformes: Meropidae 
White-fronted bee-eater, Merops bullockoides
Red-throated bee-eater, Merops bulocki
White-throated bee-eater, Merops albicollis
Olive bee-eater, Merops superciliosus
Blue-cheeked bee-eater, Merops persicus
Swallow-tailed bee-eater, Merops hirundineus
Blue-breasted bee-eater, Merops variegatus
Little bee-eater, Merops pusillus

Coraciiformes: Coraciidae 
Rufous-crowned roller, Coracias naevius
Lilac-breasted roller, Coracias caudatus
Abyssinian roller, Coracias abyssinicus
European roller, Coracias garrulus
Blue-throated roller, Eurystomus gularis
Broad-billed roller, Eurystomus glaucurus

Coraciiformes: Alcedinidae 
African dwarf kingfisher, Ispidina lecontei
African pygmy kingfisher, Ispidina picta
White-bellied kingfisher, Corythornis leucogaster
African malachite kingfisher, Corythornis cristatus
Shining-blue kingfisher, Alcedo quadribrachys
Giant kingfisher, Megaceryle maxima
Pied kingfisher, Ceryle rudis
Chocolate-backed kingfisher, Halcyon badia
Grey-headed kingfisher, Halcyon leucocephala
Striped kingfisher, Halcyon chelicuti
Blue-breasted kingfisher, Halcyon malimbica
Woodland kingfisher, Halcyon senegalensis

Falconiformes: Falconidae 
Lesser kestrel, Falco naumanni
Common kestrel, Falco tinnunculus
Grey kestrel, Falco ardosiaceus
Red-necked falcon, Falco chicquera
Red-footed falcon, Falco vespertinus
Amur falcon, Falco amurensis
Eurasian hobby, Falco subbuteo
African hobby, Falco cuvierii
Lanner falcon, Falco biarmicus
Peregrine falcon, Falco peregrinus

Psittaciformes: Psittacidae 
Grey parrot, Psittacus erithacus
Brown-necked parrot, Poicephalus robustus
Brown parrot, Poicephalus meyeri

Psittaciformes: Psittaculidae 
Red-headed lovebird, Agapornis pullarius

Passeriformes: Pittidae 
African pitta, Pitta angolensis

Passeriformes: Calyptomenidae 
African broadbill, Smithornis capensis

Passeriformes: Campephagidae 
White-breasted cuckooshrike, Ceblepyris pectoralis
Black cuckooshrike, Campephaga flava
Red-shouldered cuckooshrike, Campephaga phoenicea
Purple-throated cuckooshrike, Campephaga quiscalina

Passeriformes: Oriolidae 
Western black-headed oriole, Oriolus brachyrynchus
Eastern black-headed oriole, Oriolus larvatus
Mountain oriole, Oriolus percivali
Eurasian golden oriole, Oriolus oriolus
African golden oriole, Oriolus auratus

Passeriformes: Platysteiridae 
Chinspot batis, Batis molitor
Von Erlanger's batis, Batis erlangeri
Chestnut wattle-eye, Dyaphorophyia castanea
Jameson's wattle-eye, Dyaphorophyia jamesoni
Brown-throated wattle-eye, Platysteira cyanea
Black-throated wattle-eye, Platysteira peltata

Passeriformes: Vangidae 
Red-eyed shrike-flycatcher, Megabyas flammulatus
Black-and-white shrike-flycatcher, Bias musicus

Passeriformes: Malaconotidae 
Grey-headed bush-shrike, Malaconotus blanchoti
Northern puffback, Dryoscopus gambensis
Blackcap bush-shrike, Bocagia minuta
Brown-crowned tchagra, Tchagra australis
Black-crowned tchagra, Tchagra senegalus
Brubru, Nilaus afer
Grey-green bush-shrike, Chlorophoneus bocagei
Orange-breasted bush-shrike, Chlorophoneus sulfureopectus
Lowland sooty boubou, Laniarius leucorhynchus
Lühder's bush-shrike, Laniarius luehderi
Tropical boubou, Laniarius aethiopicus
Black-headed gonolek, Laniarius erythrogaster
Papyrus gonolek, Laniarius mufumbiri

Passeriformes: Dicruridae 
Fork-tailed drongo, Dicrurus adsimilis
Velvet-mantled drongo, Dicrurus modestus

Passeriformes: Laniidae 
Red-backed shrike, Lanius collurio
Turkestan shrike, Lanius phoenicuroides
Isabelline shrike, Lanius isabellinus
Mackinnon's shrike, Lanius mackinnoni
Lesser grey shrike, Lanius minor
Grey-backed fiscal, Lanius excubitoroides
Northern fiscal, Lanius humeralis

Passeriformes: Corvidae 
Piapiac, Ptilostomus afer
White-necked raven, Corvus albicollis
Pied crow, Corvus albus

Passeriformes: Monarchidae 
Blue-headed paradise-flycatcher, Trochocercus nitens
African paradise-flycatcher, Terpsiphone viridis
Red-bellied paradise-flycatcher, Terpsiphone rufiventer

Passeriformes: Nectariniidae 
Fraser's sunbird, Deleornis fraseri
Little green sunbird, Anthreptes seimundi
Grey-chinned sunbird, Anthreptes rectirostris
Collared sunbird, Hedydipna collaris
Green-headed sunbird, Cyanomitra verticalis
Blue-throated brown sunbird, Cyanomitra cyanolaema
Olive sunbird, Cyanomitra olivacea
Green-throated sunbird, Chalcomitra rubescens
Scarlet-chested sunbird, Chalcomitra senegalensis
Bronzy sunbird, Nectarinia kilimensis
Golden-winged sunbird, Drepanorhynchus reichenowi
Olive-bellied sunbird, Cinnyris chloropygius
Tiny sunbird, Cinnyris minullus
Mariqua sunbird, Cinnyris mariquensis
Red-chested sunbird, Cinnyris erythrocercus
Purple-banded sunbird, Cinnyris bifasciatus
Orange-tufted sunbird, Cinnyris bouvieri
Superb sunbird, Cinnyris superbus
Variable sunbird, Cinnyris venustus
Copper sunbird, Cinnyris cupreus

Passeriformes: Ploceidae 
Grosbeak weaver, Amblyospiza albifrons
Cardinal quelea, Quelea cardinalis
Red-billed quelea, Quelea quelea
Black bishop, Euplectes gierowii
Black-winged bishop, Euplectes hordeaceus
Yellow-mantled widowbird, Euplectes macroura
Fan-tailed widowbird, Euplectes axillaris
White-winged widowbird, Euplectes albonotatus
Hartlaub's widowbird, Euplectes hartlaubi
Baglafecht weaver, Ploceus baglafecht
Slender-billed weaver, Ploceus pelzelni
Little weaver, Ploceus luteolus
Spectacled weaver, Ploceus ocularis
Black-necked weaver, Ploceus nigricollis
Black-billed weaver, Ploceus melanogaster
Holub's weaver, Ploceus xanthops
Orange weaver, Ploceus aurantius
Northern brown-throated weaver, Ploceus castanops
Lesser masked weaver, Ploceus intermedius
Vitelline masked weaver, Ploceus vitellinus
Village weaver, Ploceus cucullatus
Vieillot's weaver, Ploceus nigerrimus
Weyns's weaver, Ploceus weynsi
Black-headed weaver, Ploceus melanocephalus
Golden-backed weaver, Ploceus jacksoni
Yellow-mantled weaver, Ploceus tricolor
Compact weaver, Ploceus superciliosus
Red-headed malimbe, Malimbus rubricollis
Red-headed weaver, Anaplectes rubriceps

Passeriformes: Estrildidae 
Black-bellied firefinch, Lagonosticta rara
Bar-breasted firefinch, Lagonosticta rufopicta
Red-billed firefinch, Lagonosticta senegala
African firefinch, Lagonosticta rubricata
Brown twinspot, Clytospiza monteiri
Red-cheeked cordon-bleu, Uraeginthus bengalus
Red-headed bluebill, Spermophaga ruficapilla
Black-bellied seedcracker, Pyrenestes ostrinus
Fawn-breasted waxbill, Estrilda paludicola
Common waxbill, Estrilda astrild
Black-crowned waxbill, Estrilda nonnula
Green-backed twinspot, Mandingoa nitidula
White-breasted negrofinch, Nigrita fusconotus
Grey-headed negrofinch, Nigrita canicapillus
Cut-throat finch, Amadina fasciata
Black-faced quailfinch, Ortygospiza atricollis
Black-chinned quailfinch, Ortygospiza gabonensis
Zebra waxbill, Amandava subflava
Bronze mannikin, Spermestes cucullata
Black-and-white mannikin, Spermestes bicolor
Magpie mannikin, Spermestes fringilloides

Passeriformes: Viduidae 
Pin-tailed whydah, Vidua macroura
Village indigobird, Vidua chalybeata

Passeriformes: Passeridae 
House sparrow, Passer domesticus
Northern grey-headed sparrow, Passer griseus

Passeriformes: Motacillidae 
Tree pipit, Anthus trivialis
Red-throated pipit, Anthus cervinus
Plain-backed pipit, Anthus leucophrys
African pipit, Anthus cinnamomeus
Yellow-throated longclaw, Macronyx croceus
Cape wagtail, Motacilla capensis
Yellow wagtail, Motacilla flava
African wagtail, Motacilla aguimp

Passeriformes: Fringillidae 
Western citril, Crithagra frontalis
Papyrus canary, Crithagra koliensis
Black-throated canary, Crithagra atrogularis
Yellow-fronted canary, Crithagra mozambica
White-bellied canary, Crithagra dorsostriata
Brimstone canary, Crithagra sulphurata

Passeriformes: Emberizidae 
Golden-breasted bunting, Fringillaria flaviventris

Passeriformes: Hyliotidae 
Yellow-bellied hyliota, Hyliota flavigaster

Passeriformes: Stenostiridae 
Dusky crested-flycatcher, Elminia nigromitrata
Blue crested-flycatcher, Elminia longicauda

Passeriformes: Paridae 
Northern black tit, Melaniparus leucomelas
White-shouldered black tit, Melaniparus guineensis
Dusky tit, Melaniparus funereus

Passeriformes: Remizidae 
Grey penduline tit, Anthoscopus caroli

Passeriformes: Nicatoridae 
Western nicator, Nicator chloris

Passeriformes: Alaudidae 
Rufous-naped lark, Mirafra africana
Flappet lark, Mirafra rufocinnamomea

Passeriformes: Macrosphenidae 
Northern crombec, Sylvietta brachyura
Red-faced crombec, Sylvietta whytii
Green crombec, Sylvietta virens
Moustached grass warbler, Melocichla mentalis
Yellow longbill, Macrosphenus flavicans
Grey longbill, Macrosphenus concolor

Passeriformes: Cisticolidae 
White-chinned prinia, Schistolais leucopogon
Yellow-breasted apalis, Apalis flavida
Black-throated apalis, Apalis jacksoni
Black-capped apalis, Apalis nigriceps
Buff-throated apalis, Apalis rufogularis
Buff-bellied warbler, Phyllolais pulchella
Grey-backed camaroptera, Camaroptera brachyura
Olive-green camaroptera, Camaroptera chloronota
Grey-capped warbler, Eminia lepida
Red-faced cisticola, Cisticola erythrops
Singing cisticola, Cisticola cantans
Whistling cisticola, Cisticola lateralis
Winding cisticola, Cisticola galactotes
Carruthers's cisticola, Cisticola carruthersi
Croaking cisticola, Cisticola natalensis
Short-winged cisticola, Cisticola brachypterus
Zitting cisticola, Cisticola juncidis
Black-faced rufous warbler, Bathmocercus rufus
Tawny-flanked prinia, Prinia subflava

Passeriformes: Locustellidae 
River warbler, Locustella fluviatilis
Fan-tailed grassbird, Schoenicola brevirostris
White-winged swamp warbler, Bradypterus carpalis

Passeriformes: Acrocephalidae 
Olivaceous warbler, Iduna pallida
Dark-capped yellow warbler, Iduna natalensis
Upcher's warbler, Hippolais languida
Icterine warbler, Hippolais icterina
Sedge warbler, Acrocephalus schoenobaenus
Common reed warbler, Acrocephalus scirpaceus
Lesser swamp warbler, Acrocephalus gracilirostris
Greater swamp warbler, Acrocephalus rufescens
Great reed warbler, Acrocephalus arundinaceus

Passeriformes: Hirundinidae 
Grey-rumped swallow, Pseudhirundo griseopyga
White-headed saw-wing, Psalidoprocne albiceps
Black saw-wing, Psalidoprocne pristoptera
Northern house martin, Delichon urbicum
Lesser striped swallow, Cecropis abyssinica
Rufous-chested swallow, Cecropis semirufa
Mosque swallow, Cecropis senegalensis
Red-rumped swallow, Cecropis daurica
Blue swallow, Hirundo atrocaerulea
Wire-tailed swallow, Hirundo smithii
Barn swallow, Hirundo rustica
Angola swallow, Hirundo angolensis
Ethiopian swallow, Hirundo aethiopica
Rock martin, Ptyonoprogne fuligula
Banded martin, Neophedina cincta
Plain martin, Riparia paludicola
Sand martin, Riparia riparia

Passeriformes: Pycnonotidae 
Slender-billed greenbul, Stelgidillas gracilirostris
Red-tailed bristlebill, Bleda syndactylus
Lesser bristlebill, Bleda notatus
Yellow-throated greenbul, Atimastillas flavicollis
Spotted greenbul, Ixonotus guttatus
Honeyguide greenbul, Baeopogon indicator
Yellow-whiskered greenbul, Eurillas latirostris
Little greenbul, Eurillas virens
Grey greenbul, Eurillas gracilis
Plain greenbul, Eurillas curvirostris
Red-tailed greenbul, Criniger calurus
White-throated greenbul, Phyllastrephus albigularis
Toro greenbul, Phyllastrephus hypochloris
Leaf-love, Phyllastrephus scandens
Common bulbul, Pycnonotus barbatus

Passeriformes: Phylloscopidae 
Wood warbler, Rhadina sibilatrix
Willow warbler, Phylloscopus trochilus
Uganda woodland warbler, Seicercus budongoensis

Passeriformes: Scotocercidae 
Green hylia, Hylia prasina
Tit hylia, Pholidornis rushiae

Passeriformes: Sylviidae 
Eurasian blackcap, Sylvia atricapilla
Garden warbler, Sylvia borin
Barred warbler, Curruca nisoria
Common whitethroat, Curruca communis

Passeriformes: Zosteropidae 
Green white-eye, Zosterops stuhlmanni
Northern yellow white-eye, Zosterops senegalensis

Passeriformes: Pellorneidae 
Brown thrush babbler, Illadopsis fulvescens

Passeriformes: Leiothrichidae 
Black-lored babbler, Turdoides sharpei
Brown babbler, Turdoides plebejus

Passeriformes: Buphagidae 
Red-billed oxpecker, Buphagus erythrorhynchus

Passeriformes: Sturnidae 
Wattled starling, Creatophora cinerea
Red-winged starling, Onychognathus morio
Chestnut-winged starling, Onychognathus fulgidus
Stuhlmann's starling, Poeoptera stuhlmanni
Rüppell's glossy starling, Lamprotornis purpuroptera
Splendid glossy starling, Lamprotornis splendidus
Lesser blue-eared starling, Lamprotornis chloropterus
Purple starling, Lamprotornis purpureus
Bronze-tailed starling, Lamprotornis chalcurus
Greater blue-eared starling, Lamprotornis chalybaeus
Amethyst starling, Cinnyricinclus leucogaster
Purple-headed starling, Hylopsar purpureiceps

Passeriformes: Muscicapidae 
Fire-crested alethe, Alethe castanea
Brown-backed scrub robin, Cercotrichas hartlaubi
White-browed scrub robin, Cercotrichas leucophrys
Spotted flycatcher, Muscicapa striata
Ashy flycatcher, Muscicapa caerulescens
Swamp flycatcher, Muscicapa aquatica
African dusky flycatcher, Muscicapa adusta
Dusky-blue flycatcher, Muscicapa comitata
Sooty flycatcher, Muscicapa infuscata
Grey-throated tit flycatcher, Myioparus griseigularis
Grey tit flycatcher, Myioparus plumbeus
Pale flycatcher, Bradornis pallidus
Northern black flycatcher, Melaenornis edolioides
White-browed robin chat, Cossypha heuglini
Snowy-crowned robin chat, Cossypha niveicapilla
Blue-shouldered robin chat, Cossypha cyanocampter
Brown-chested alethe, Chamaetylas poliocephala
Lowland akalat, Sheppardia cyornithopsis
Grey-winged akalat, Sheppardia polioptera
Forest robin, Stiphrornis erythrothorax
Common nightingale, Luscinia megarhynchos
Semi-collared flycatcher, Ficedula semitorquata
Common redstart, Phoenicurus phoenicurus
Whinchat, Saxicola rubetra
African stonechat, Saxicola torquatus
Sooty chat, Myrmecocichla nigra
Northern wheatear, Oenanthe oenanthe
Isabelline wheatear, Oenanthe isabellina
Mocking cliff chat, Thamnolaea cinnamomeiventris

Passeriformes: Turdidae 
Rufous flycatcher thrush, Stizorhina fraseri
Ethiopian thrush, Turdus abyssinicus
African thrush, Turdus pelios

See also
 List of birds of Africa
 List of birds of Uganda

References

Jinja
Jinja District
Birds, Jinja